Bosniak People's Party is a national minority party in Serbia. It currently has one member in the National Assembly and is in coalition with the ruling Serbian Progressive Party.

 

Bosniak political parties in Serbia